The discography of Bedouin Soundclash, a Canadian alternative rock band, consists of five studio albums, one extended play and 12 singles. The group was founded in 2001 by Jay Malinowski, Eon Sinclair and Pat Pengelly while studying at Queen's University in Kingston, Ontario. Their debut studio album Root Fire was released independently that year. It is a hybrid of genres, combining reggae, soul and African tribal music.

Bedouin Soundclash then worked extensively with producer Daryl Jenifer of the band Bad Brains in recording their second studio album Sounding a Mosaic. Released in September 2004, it reached number nine on the United States Billboard Top Reggae Albums chart., and was certified platinum by Music Canada (MC). Three singles were released from the album: "When the Night Feels My Song", "Shelter" and "Gyasi Went Home".  "When the Night Feels My Song" was the only single to chart, peaking at number 24 in the United Kingdom.

The band released their third studio album, Street Gospels, in August 2007, which featured collaborations with Money Mark and Wade MacNeil. The album peaked at number two on the Canadian Albums Chart and was certified gold by Music Canada. Five singles were released from the album, with "Walls Fall Down" charting at number six on the Billboard Canadian Hot 100.

In 2009, Pengelly left Bedouin Soundclash and was replaced by Sekou Lumumba on the band's fourth studio album Light the Horizon, released in September 2010. It reached number 14 in Canada. Three singles were released from the album: "Mountain Top", "Elongo" and "Brutal Hearts", a collaboration with Cœur de pirate.

Albums

Studio albums

Extended plays

Singles

Other appearances

Music videos

References

External links
 
 

Alternative rock discographies
Discographies of Canadian artists